Timo Räisänen (born 25 July 1979) is a Swedish musician. He has been part of Håkan Hellström's band, and has also played in the band Her Majesty. In 2004, he started his solo career.

Räisänen was born in Gothenburg, Sweden. His mother was born in India, the daughter of an Anglo-Indian mother and a Swedish father. His father, who was raised in Brazil, had Finnish ancestry. After his parents married, they moved to Sweden.
The title of his 2006 album, I'm Indian refers to his mother's ancestry.

In 2007, Räisänen received the P3 Guld award, where he was named best male artist of 2007.

In 2008, Räisänen received another P3 Guld award, where he was named best live artist of 2008.

Räisänen frequently features songs written by other artists on the B-side of his singles. In 2008, he released an album titled ...And Then There Was Timo consisting of a handful of newly recorded covers.

In 2009, he sang live along with In Flames, on their song "Alias".
Räisänen has also made his own acoustic cover version of In Flames' "The Mirror's Truth".

Räisänen performed on the National Day of Sweden in 2009 and in the celebration LOVE Stockholm 2010 which was dedicated to Crown Princess Victoria's marriage to Prince Daniel.

In 2016 his friend Martin Schaub suggested Räisänen make a record of 70's late folk-pop artist Ted Gärdestad covers. Räisänen at first thought his friend had gone mad, but eventually made the record, to much success and he claims it made him start writing songs in Swedish. The following year he released "Tro, Hat, Stöld" ( Faith, Hate, Theft), an album consisting of songs in the Swedish language. Both albums resulted in large successful Swedish tours.

Discography

Albums
2005 - Lovers Are Lonely #22 SWE
2006 - I'm Indian #17 SWE
2007 - Love Will Turn You Around #3 SWE
2008 - ...And Then There Was Timo #13 SWE
2010 - The Anatomy of Timo Räisänen #5 SWE
2012 - Endeavor
2016 - Timo sjunger Ted
2017 - Tro, hat, stöld

Singles
2004 - "Lovers Are Lonely"
2005 - "Don't Let the Devil Ruin it All"
2005 - "Pussycat"
2006 - "Fear No Darkness, Promised Child"
2006 - "Let's Kill Ourselves a Son"
2007 - "Sweet Marie"
2007 - "My Valentine"
2008 - "Sixteen"
2008 - "Spill Your Beans" (download only)
2008 - "About You Now"
2009 - "Creep"
2010 - "Numbers"
2010 - "Outcast"
2010 - "Hollow Heart"
2012 - "Second Cut"

References

External links 

 www.timoraisanen.se 

Indian

Living people
1979 births
Anglo-Indian people
Swedish people of English descent
Swedish people of Finnish descent
Swedish people of Indian descent
Indian people of Swedish descent
Swedish people of Anglo-Indian descent
English-language singers from Sweden
Swedish-language singers
21st-century Swedish singers